Asagena is a genus of comb-footed spiders (family Theridiidae) that was first described by Carl Jakob Sundevall in 1833.

Species
 it contains nine species, found in North America, Europe, Asia, and Algeria:
Asagena americana Emerton, 1882 – Canada, USA, Mexico, China
Asagena brignolii (Knoflach, 1996) – Greece
Asagena fulva (Keyserling, 1884) – USA, Mexico
Asagena italica (Knoflach, 1996) – France (incl. Corsica), Switzerland, Italy, Algeria
Asagena medialis (Banks, 1898) – USA, Mexico
Asagena meridionalis Kulczyński, 1894 – Central to south-eastern and eastern Europe, Georgia
Asagena phalerata (Panzer, 1801) (type) – Europe, Turkey, Caucasus, Russia (Europe to Far East), Kazakhstan, Iran, Central Asia, China, Korea
Asagena pulcher (Keyserling, 1884) – USA
Asagena semideserta (Ponomarev, 2005) – Kazakhstan, Mongolia

In synonymy:
A. amurica Strand, 1907 = Asagena phalerata (Panzer, 1801)
A. nesiotes  = Asagena fulva (Keyserling, 1884)
A. parvula  = Asagena fulva (Keyserling, 1884)
A. phalerata  = Asagena phalerata (Panzer, 1801)
A. phalerata  = Asagena phalerata (Panzer, 1801)
A. venusta  = Asagena fulva (Keyserling, 1884)

See also
 List of Theridiidae species

References

Araneomorphae genera
Cosmopolitan spiders
Taxa named by Carl Jakob Sundevall
Theridiidae